is a 1962 Japanese drama film directed by Kaneto Shindo, and starring Taiji Tonoyama, Kei Satō, and Nobuko Otowa, produced by Shindo's company Kindai Eiga Kyokai.

Plot
A ship loses all means of navigation in a storm. The crew becomes increasingly desperate as food and water run out. The captain, Kamegoro (Taiji Tonoyama), prays to the sailor's god Kompira to rescue them and rations their food and water. His grandson, Sankichi (Kei Yamamoto), follows his grandfather, but the other two crew members, Hachizo (Kei Satō) and Gorosuke (Nobuko Otowa) rebel and insist on eating their rations of food all at once.

In a vision, Kamegoro sees Kompira, who promises to deliver rain. Then the rain comes and the threat of dying of thirst is gone, but there is no food. Each member of the crew revisits pleasant times, which are recreated as flashbacks in the film. Kamegoro also has less pleasant memories of his war service, where he saw another soldier turn to cannibalism. After weeks of hunger, Hachizo and Gorosuke think of killing and eating Sankichi. They trick him with the promise of food and then kill him with an axe. Kamegoro goes to find him. Hachizo tries to fight but they are both weakened by hunger. Gorosuke repents and begs for forgiveness. They bury Sankichi at sea.

Kamegoro lies to the two remaining crew members that he has had another vision of Kompira, who has blown a ship from San Francisco off course with a typhoon so that it will find them. A ship which genuinely has been blown off course exactly as Kamegoro says then appears. They are rescued. While recovering on the deck of the ship, Gorosuke goes into a mad dance, falls into a cargo hold, and dies. Then Hachizo also commits suicide, leaving only Kamegoro alive.

Cast
Taiji Tonoyama as Kamegoro
Nobuko Otowa as Gorozuke
Kei Satō as Hachizo
Kei Yamamoto as Sankichi
Hideo Kanze as Kompira
Kentaro Kaji as the bosun

Production

The story is based on a work Kaijinmaru (海神丸) by Yaeko Nogami, which itself is based on a true story.

Reception
The film won an award at the National Arts Festival (文部省芸術祭文部大臣賞).

References

External links

1962 films
1962 drama films
Japanese drama films
1960s Japanese-language films
Films directed by Kaneto Shindo
Films about mermaids
1960s Japanese films